Kung-Fu Master, known as  in Japan, is a side-scrolling beat 'em up game developed by Irem as an arcade game in 1984, and distributed by Data East in North America. Designed by Takashi Nishiyama, the game was based on Hong Kong martial arts films. It is a sequel to the Jackie Chan and Sammo Hung film Wheels on Meals (1984), called Spartan X in Japan, with the protagonist Thomas named after Jackie Chan's character in the film. The game is also heavily inspired by the Bruce Lee film Game of Death (1972), which was the basis for the game's concept. Nishiyama, who had previously designed the side-scrolling shooter Moon Patrol (1982), combined fighting elements with a shoot 'em up gameplay rhythm. Irem and Data East exported the game to the West without the Spartan X license.

The player controls Thomas, the titular Kung-Fu Master, as he fights his way through the five levels of the Devil's Temple to rescue his girlfriend Sylvia from the crime boss Mr. X. As he ascends the tower, he has to fight many enemies along the way and five end-of-level boss battles, a concept inspired by Game of Death. Thomas and each boss have a health meter, and the game temporarily becomes a one-on-one fighting game during boss battles.

The game was a major commercial success, topping the Japanese arcade charts and becoming America's second highest-grossing arcade game of 1985, while receiving critical acclaim for its fast-paced, side-scrolling gameplay and detailed, colorful graphics. A port for the Nintendo Entertainment System (known as the Famicom in Japan) was developed by Nintendo under the direction of Shigeru Miyamoto, released as Spartan X in Japan and Kung-Fu in the West, selling  copies worldwide. It was also one of the top five best-selling Commodore 64 games of 1986. It spawned the sequel Spartan X 2 (1991) and the spiritual successors Trojan (1986) and Vigilante (1988).

Kung-Fu Master was an influential game that had a significant cultural impact. It is regarded as the first beat 'em up brawler, and an early example of the side-scrolling character action game genre, which became popular during the mid-to-late 1980s. Miyamoto's work on the NES port inspired his development of the side-scrolling platform game Super Mario Bros. (1985), while Nishiyama was hired by Capcom where he used the game's boss battles as the basis for the fighting game Street Fighter (1987), before working for SNK on fighting games such as Fatal Fury and The King of Fighters. Kung-Fu Master also influenced other media, such as the Red Ribbon Army saga (1985-1986) of the manga and anime series Dragon Ball, as well as the French film Kung Fu Master (1988).

Gameplay

The player controls Thomas with a four-way joystick and two attack buttons to punch and kick. Unlike more conventional side-scrolling games, the joystick is used not only to crouch, but also to jump. Punches and kicks can be performed from a standing, crouching or jumping position. Punches award more points than kicks and do more damage, but their range is shorter. Thomas has a health meter indicating how much damage he can take. He can absorb a significant amount of damage, but loses a life if he takes too many hits.

Underlings encountered by the player include Grippers, who can grab Thomas and drain his energy until shaken off; Knife Throwers, who can throw at two different heights and must be hit twice; and Tom Toms, short fighters who can either grab Thomas or somersault to strike his head when he is crouching. On even-numbered floors, the player must also deal with falling balls and pots, snakes, poisonous moths, fire-breathing dragons, and exploding confetti balls.

The Devil's Temple has five floors, each ending with a different boss (described as "sons of the devil" at the start of the game). Each boss has a health meter like Thomas, which leads to the game temporarily becoming a one-on-one fighting game during a boss battle. In order to complete a floor, Thomas must connect enough strikes to completely drain the boss's energy meter; he can then climb the stairs to the next floor. Thomas has a fixed time limit to complete each floor; if time runs out or his meter is completely drained, the player loses one life and must replay the entire floor. Upon completing a floor, the player receives bonus points for remaining time and energy.

The bosses of the first four levels are Stick Fighter, Boomerang Fighter, Giant, and Black Magician. The boss of the fifth floor is Mr. X, the leader of the gang that kidnapped Sylvia. Once he is defeated, Thomas rescues Sylvia and the game restarts at a higher difficulty level.

An extra life is given at 50,000 points; thereafter, the rest of the game is on "survival of the fittest" mode. Play continues until the last Thomas is dead, which ends the game.

Development
The game was designed for Irem by Takashi Nishiyama. Kung-Fu Master is based on Hong Kong martial arts films. It is a loose adaptation of the Jackie Chan and Sammo Hung film Wheels on Meals (1984), called Spartan X in Japan, specifically the final part of the film which involves Thomas (Jackie Chan) climbing a Spanish castle to rescue Sylvia (Lola Forner), with the help of Moby (Sammo Hung) and his cousin David (Yuen Biao). The game also borrows heavily from Bruce Lee's 1972 film Game of Death, with the five-level Devil's Temple reflecting the movie's setting of a five-level pagoda with a martial arts master in each level; in contrast, Wheels on Meals takes place in Spain as opposed to the game's East Asian setting. The final part of Wheels on Meals had itself borrowed its concept of climbing an enemy base by fighting enemies along the way from Game of Death. The game was also influenced by the Bruce Lee film Enter the Dragon (1973).

Nishiyama had earlier created Irem's 1982 arcade side-scrolling shooter game Moon Patrol. Nishiyama designed Kung-Fu Master by combining a shoot 'em up gameplay rhythm with fighting elements.

The music and sound for the arcade game were composed by Masato Ishizaki. Nishiyama initially believed the game did not need any music, as it was a martial arts game and he thought it would sound more impressive to just have the sound effects. Ishizaki had a melody in mind for the game, and suggested that two versions be made, with and without the music, and see which sounds better. After hearing both versions, Nishiyama agreed that the music version sounds better and included Ishizaki's melody in the game.

Prior to the game's development, Nishiyama was invited to join Capcom by its founder Kenzo Tsujimoto in 1983, after he had left Irem. Nishiyama decided to remain in Irem up until the development of Spartan X. He eventually decided to leave Irem and join Capcom before the game was complete. Ishizaki later went on to compose the music and sound for R-Type (1987).

Release
The arcade game was originally released as Spartan X in Japan, on November 24, 1984. It was then released internationally as Kung-Fu Master, in North America during late 1984 and in Europe by early 1985.

Ports
In June 1985, the game was ported to the Nintendo Entertainment System (NES), known as the Famicom in Japan; it was released Spartan X in Japan, before releasing internationally as Kung Fu in North America and PAL regions. It was converted and published by Nintendo, with the port designed and directed by Shigeru Miyamoto. He led the Nintendo development team responsible for porting the Famicom port. He was interested in porting Kung-Fu Master due to its side-scrolling action gameplay, which was something he had in mind for the platformer genre, so he wanted to gain experience developing side-scrolling games with Excitebike (1984) and Kung Fu. Koji Kondo also worked on the Famicom port, designing the sound effects. In the NES version, Thomas is closely modelled after Jackie Chan, making it the first video game to feature a real-life person.

The game was ported to the Atari 2600 by programmer Dan Kitchen (brother of Garry Kitchen), shortly after he had ported Ghostbusters (1984) to the Atari 2600. This port of Kung-Fu Master is considered a significant programming feat considering the technical limitations of the Atari 2600.

Kung-Fu Master was also ported to the Atari 7800, Amstrad CPC, Apple II, Commodore 64, MSX (Irem/ASCII version as Seiken Achō), PlayChoice-10 (arcade, nearly the same as the NES version), and ZX Spectrum.

Reception

Arcade
In Japan, the Game Machine arcade charts listed Spartan X as the top-grossing table arcade cabinet for two months in 1984, from January 15 through February 1984. It regained popularity in Japanese arcades following the release of the Famicom port later that year. In Europe, it was a major arcade hit in 1985.

In North America, it was a major hit in arcades, reaching number-one on the US arcade earnings charts upon release, and selling 5,000 arcade cabinets by April 1985. It was later the second top-grossing upright arcade cabinet on the RePlay charts in November 1985 (just below Capcom's Commando). It ended the year as America's second highest-grossing arcade game of 1985, below the Data East fighting game Karate Champ. Kung-Fu Master was later also America's eleventh highest-grossing arcade game of 1986, according to the annual RePlay chart.

Claire Edgley of Computer and Video Games gave the arcade game a positive review in March 1985. She was positively surprised by the "hard-hitting" action, the "very fast" and "breath-taking" pace, and large number of enemies. She also praised the controls, referring to Thomas as "a whirling, kicking, jumping, fighting machine" controlled by an eight-way joystick and two buttons, the "energy levels" which allow the player to "absorb a large number of hits" from enemies, the smooth "lifelike" picturesque graphics, and the catchy music jingles. She concluded that if "you thought that Karate Champ was good — wait 'til you try this one!"

Mike Roberts also gave the arcade game a positive review in the May 1985 issue of Computer Gamer. He noted it was part of the "current craze" for arcade martial arts games, but said it had "more of a story line and game play" than others, noting the progression through five floors, simplified controls, abilities such as ducking and jumping, and multiple "standard baddies" followed by "super baddies" who are tougher to beat; he refers to the final opponent as the boss of organization X. Matt Fox later reviewed the arcade game in 2013, praising the gameplay, animation and innovation.

Ports
In Japan, the Famicom version sold  copies. In North America, the NES version titled Kung Fu was the top-selling video game in the United States during July 1986, and again in September 1986. The NES version went on to sell  copies worldwide. In Europe, the Commodore 64 port topped the UK Gallup software sales charts in February 1986, and went on to become one of the top five best-selling Commodore 64 games of 1986. The ZX Spectrum version also sold well.

Top Score reviewed the NES version in early 1987, calling it "a fantastic reproduction of its arcade counterpart" and an action-packed winner. Tony Takoushi of Computer and Video Games called it "a near perfect conversion with all the gameplay and levels" intact from the arcade original, praising the gameplay as well as the "solid" graphics and sound. In 2017, IGN ranked the NES port at number 62 on its list of top 100 NES games. They said that, despite being a "dumbed-down port" compared to the arcade original, it was a fun game with rewarding gameplay, challenging boss battles and replay value.

Commodore User gave the Commodore 64 version a positive review in February 1986. Rick Teverbaugh reviewed the Commodore and Apple versions for Computer Gaming World in 1986. He called it "a karate game with adventure elements thrown in" and said that it looked better on the Commodore than on the Apple.

Legacy

The arcade version was later included along with the arcade versions of 10-Yard Fight and Zippy Race in IAC/Irem Arcade Classics for the PlayStation and Sega Saturn, released in Japan only in 1996 by Irem and I'Max. The arcade version was released to cell phones.

The Amstrad CPC and ZX Spectrum versions of the game were included on the 1986 compilation They Sold a Million 3, along with Fighter Pilot, Ghostbusters, and Rambo.

A remake of the game has been announced for release exclusively for the Intellivision Amico.

Sequels and successors
After designing Kung-Fu Master, Takashi Nishiyama was later hired by Capcom. He designed an arcade successor for Capcom, Trojan (1986), which evolved the basic gameplay concepts of Kung-Fu Master. The NES port included a one-on-one fighting mode, a precursor to Nishiyama's work on Street Fighter.

At Irem, an arcade sequel called Beyond Kung-Fu: Return of the Master was developed and underwent location testing in 1987, but was shelved after it underperformed. Beyond Kung-Fu was then revamped into Vigilante, after Irem decided to give the game a more Americanized setting, which was released in 1988.

In 1990, the arcade game received a Game Boy sequel titled as Kung-Fu Master (Spartan X in Japan), which has similar gameplay to the arcade game, but with a completely different plot and setting.

In 1991, a sequel was released in Japan for the Famicom, titled Spartan X 2. It was originally planned to release in North America as Kung Fu II in the fall of 1991, but ended up not releasing there. Spartan X 2 did not receive a North American release until 2016, when it was included as a built-in title for the Retro-Bit Generations retro video game console under the name Kung-Fu Master 2.

Impact

Beat 'em up and fighting games
Kung-Fu Master is regarded as the first beat 'em up video game in the world. According to Retro Gamer, Kung-Fu Master invented the brawler genre. It distinguished itself from Karate Champ by simplifying the combat system and featuring multiple opponents along a side-scrolling playfield. It established the "walk forward and beat up dudes" trend that influenced many games after it. It also established the end-of-level boss battle structure used in the beat 'em up genre, with the player character progressing through levels and fighting a boss character at the end of each level; in turn, this end-of-level boss battle structure was adapted from the Bruce Lee film Game of Death, where Lee's character fights a different boss character on each floor as he ascends a pagoda.

According to Matt Fox, it "one hundred percent defined" the beat 'em up genre, with variations of its plot structure used in virtually every scrolling beat 'em up since. There were numerous imitators, such as Black Belt (1986) and Kung Fu Kid (1987) on the Sega Master System. Other beat 'em ups that followed its single-plane side-scrolling format include arcade games such as Sega's My Hero and Flashgal (1985), Taito's The Ninja Warriors (1987), Data East's Bad Dudes Vs. DragonNinja (1988) and Namco's Splatterhouse (1988). Other titles such as Technōs Japan's Renegade (1986) and Double Dragon (1987), Capcom's Final Fight (1989) and Sega's Streets of Rage (1991) evolved the beat 'em up formula established by Kung-Fu Master with a belt-scrolling format.

The boss battles had health meters for the player character and each boss, which led to the game temporarily becoming a one-on-one fighting game during boss battles. The Kung-Fu Master boss battles became the basis for the 1987 fighting game Street Fighter, which was directed by Kung-Fu Master designer Takashi Nishiyama after leaving Irem for Capcom. Following the release of Kung-Fu Master, Capcom was interested in hiring Nishiyama, who then led the development of Street Fighter. Nishiyama later left Capcom to run SNK's video game development division, creating the Neo Geo arcade system board and fighting games including Fatal Fury, Art of Fighting, Samurai Shodown and The King of Fighters.

Side-scrolling character action games
Kung-Fu Master was the most notable early example of a side-scrolling character action game, a genre of games that featured large sprite characters in colorful, side-scrolling environments, with the core gameplay consisting of fighting large groups of weaker enemies using attacks (or weapons) such as punches, kicks, guns, swords, ninjutsu or magic. This side-scrolling character action game format became popular during the mid-to-late 1980s, with arcade examples including ninja games such as Taito's The Legend of Kage (1985), Sega's Shinobi (1987), and Tecmo's Ninja Gaiden (1988) as well as run and gun video games such as Konami's Rush'n Attack and Namco's Rolling Thunder (1986). Kung-Fu Master was particularly the first and most influential side-scrolling martial arts action game, serving as the prototype for most martial arts games during the late 1980s, and also established the health meter mechanic as a standard feature in fighting games and side-scrolling action games such as beat 'em ups. Jamie Lendino also notes that, unlike "most arcade games" which had emphasized high scores and lives, Kung-Fu Master "had a genuine narrative arc" with a beginning, middle and end.

The game's side-scrolling action gameplay played a key role in the development of Nintendo's influential side-scrolling platform game Super Mario Bros. (1985), developed by the same Nintendo team behind the NES port Kung Fu. Shigeru Miyamoto cited his development of the Famicom port as one of the key factors behind his creation of Super Mario Bros. According to Miyamoto, the concept of Super Mario Bros. came about as a result of the "technical know-how" built up from Excitebike and Kung Fu, his work on which inspired him to come up with a game that would have the player "strategize while scrolling sideways" over long distances, have aboveground and underground levels, and have colorful backgrounds rather than black backgrounds, resulting in the creation of Super Mario Bros. Kung Fu was also one of the first NES titles that originated from a third-party developer, giving it a "special place" in the history of the Nintendo Entertainment System according to IGN.

Popular culture
Akira Toriyama cited the Famicom version of Spartan X as an inspiration for a major saga in the manga and anime series Dragon Ball: the Red Ribbon Army saga (1985-1986), specifically the Muscle Tower arc, which involves Goku ascending an enemy base and fighting enemies on each floor. This arc was a turning point for Dragon Ball, a departure from the tournament format of the previous saga. Tooru Fujisawa, creator of manga and anime series Great Teacher Onizuka (GTO), is also a fan of Spartan X.

The game also influenced a French film called Kung Fu Master (1988) directed by Agnès Varda. Despite the title, it is not an adaptation of the game, nor is it a martial arts film, but it is rather a drama film concerning a divorced mother falling in love with a 14-year old video game player. The film showcases many French arcade games and the characters interest in Kung-Fu Master arcade game is a central plot device.

Notes

References

'Kung Fu Master (Coin-Op) by Data East', Great Game Database.com  Retrieved April 15, 2005
'Data East goes bankrupt', GameSpot (July 7, 2003) Retrieved April 15, 2005
Bousiges, Alexis. 'Kung Fu Master', Arcade History, (March 2, 2005) Retrieved April 15, 2005.

External links

 
 Kung-Fu Master at arcade-history
 
Kung Fu (NES) at NinDB
 

1984 video games
Absolute Entertainment games
Amstrad CPC games
Apple II games
Arcade video games
Atari 2600 games
Atari 7800 games
Bruceploitation
Commodore 64 games
Data East video games
Game Boy games
Irem games
Jackie Chan video games
MSX games
Multiplayer and single-player video games
Nintendo Entertainment System games
Nintendo games
Side-scrolling beat 'em ups
U.S. Gold games
Video games based on films
Video games developed in Japan
ZX Spectrum games